Shooting competitions at the 2020 Summer Olympics in Tokyo were originally scheduled from 25 July to 3 August 2020, due to the postponement of the Summer Olympics to 2021, the rescheduled dates were on 24 July to 2 August 2021 at the Asaka Shooting Range. Unlike in 2016, the number of shooters competing across fifteen events at these Games had been reduced from 390 to 360, with an equal distribution between men and women. Furthermore, several significant changes were instituted in the Olympic shooting program, including the substitution of three male-only events (rifle prone, free pistol, and double trap), with the mixed team competitions.

Competition format
On 9 June 2017, the International Shooting Sport Federation welcomed the decision of the International Olympic Committee to approve the changes of the Olympic shooting program to achieve gender equality and to enhance the sport's popularity and worldwide appeal. One of the significant changes in the program was to replace the three men-only events, namely 50 m rifle prone, 50 m pistol, and double trap, with the mixed team competitions (rifle, pistol, and trap), which were highly encouraged as a means of ensuring gender equality. Other ratified changes included the same number of shots for both men and women, and the progressive elimination finals for both the women's sport pistol and the shotgun events.

Similar to 2016 format, all shooters advanced to the Olympic finals of their individual events must start from scratch and compete against each other in a series of elimination rounds. The stage continues until the competition leaves with only two shooters battling out in a duel to decide the gold and silver medals.

Qualification

In February 2018, the International Shooting Sport Federation has agreed to change the rules on the allocation of the Olympic quota places, as it aims to attain gender equality. As a result, a total of 360 quota places, an equal distribution between men and women, will be awarded at the top-level global and continental championships.

As per the guidelines from the International Shooting Sport Federation, qualification period commences with the 2018 ISSF World Shooting Championships in Changwon, South Korea, which concludes on 15 September 2018, less than two years before the Olympics. There, forty-eight individual and twelve mixed team quota places will be assigned. Throughout the process, quota places will be generally awarded when a shooter earns a gold medal in an ISSF World Cup series or posts a top finish at the ISSF World Championships or the continental championships (Africa, Europe, Asia, Oceania, and the Americas).

After the qualification period concludes and all NOCs receive the official list of quota places, the ISSF will check the World Ranking list in each of the individual shooting events. The highest-ranked shooter, who has not qualified in any event and whose NOC does not have a berth in a specific event, will obtain a direct Olympic quota place.

Unlike the previous Games, host nation Japan is guaranteed twelve quota places, with one in each of the individual shooting events.

Schedule

Medal summary

Medal table

Men's events

Women's events

Mixed events

Records broken

See also
Shooting at the 2018 Asian Games
Shooting at the 2018 Commonwealth Games
Shooting at the 2019 European Games
Shooting at the 2019 Pan American Games
Shooting at the 2020 Summer Paralympics

References

External links
 Results book 

 
2020
2020 Summer Olympics events
Olympic
2020